The Treaty of Senlis concerning the Burgundian succession was signed at Senlis, Oise on 23 May 1493 between Maximilian I of Habsburg and his son Philip "the Handsome", Archduke of Austria, and King Charles VIII of France.

Background 
After the last Valois Duke of Burgundy, Charles the Bold, had died without male heir at the 1477 Battle of Nancy, his cousin Louis XI of France was determined to come into his inheritance, especially the Burgundian Netherlands with the thriving County of Flanders. However, Mary the Rich, daughter of Charles the Bold, and her husband Maximilian also claimed their rights, which led to clashes of arms culminating at the 1479 Battle of Guinegate, concluded in favour of Mary and Maximilian. Nevertheless, Mary died in 1482 and according to the Treaty of Arras, Maximilian had to cede Burgundy, the County of Artois including the City of Arras and several minor lordships to France as dowry for the proposed marriage of their daughter, Margaret, with Louis' son Charles.

When Charles VIII, now King of France, married Anne of Brittany – who was at that time married in proxy to Maximilian – instead of Margaret, Maximilian urged the return of his daughter and the retrieval of the County of Burgundy, Artois and Charolais. In 1493, Charles VIII, stuck in the conflict with King Alfonso II of Naples, finally had to acknowledge the claims.

Contents 
Based on the terms of the Senlis Treaty, all hostilities between France and the Seventeen Provinces were officially over. Moreover, the disputed territories were relinquished to the House of Habsburg and Artois and Flanders were annexed by the Holy Roman Empire. However, France was still able to retain powerful legal claims and outposts in both provinces.
The Duchy of Burgundy (with capital Dijon, not to be confused with the Free County of Burgundy with capital Dole), which had also been ceded to France in 1482, remained in French hands.

The Treaty of Senlis had 48 articles, called "items":

Notes

References
  – Original text of the Treaty of Senlis in Middle French, as quoted in a 1726 copy.
Potter, David. A History of France, 1460-1560: The Emergence of a Nation-State. New Studies in Medieval History, 1995.

External links
Britannica - Treaty of Senlis
Catholic Encyclopedia - Burgundy
Original 1494 correspondence on the difficulties of the application of the Treaty of Senlis 

Senlis
1490s in France
Habsburg Netherlands
1490s treaties
Senlis
Treaty of Senlis
1490s in the Holy Roman Empire
1493 in Europe
France–Holy Roman Empire relations
Maximilian I, Holy Roman Emperor